Etna  is an auxiliary ship that entered service with the Marina Militare in 1998. She is designed to support fleet operations with fuel and dry stores. Etna is the single Italian vessel of the Etna class while a sister ship, HS Prometheus, was built under licence in Greece and entered service with the Hellenic Navy in 2003.

Design and construction
Etna is the fifth Italian ship to bear the name. She was ordered in July 1995, and was built by Fincantieri at the Riva Trigoso Naval Shipyard. She was launched in July 1997, and underwent sea trials during November before delivery to the Italian Navy in February 1998.

Etna is designed as a support ship able to supply a larger squadron at sea. As such, she has the capability to refuel ships, produce fresh water, and carry cargo. She has a cargo capacity of up to 5,795 tons of diesel fuel, 1,585 tons of aviation fuel for aircraft on aircraft carriers, 160 tons of fresh water, up to twelve containers, for about total 2,000 m3 of solid goods. She is powered by two Sulzer diesel engines, which drive two propellers through reduction gearing.

Armament
Etna is equipped with minimal armament and an electronic warfare support measures system. The ship is also equipped with an Alenia Marconi Systems radar, a Selex command system and an Elmer MAC communications system.

Service history
In March 2011, Etna was deployed to the coast of Libya as part of Operation Unified Protector, a NATO operation to enforce an arms embargo on Libya.

References

External links

 Etna (A 5326) Marina Militare website

Auxiliary ships of the Italian Navy
1997 ships
Ships built by Cantieri Navali del Tirreno e Riuniti